Tonawanda (formally  City of Tonawanda) is a city in Erie County, New York, United States. The population was 15,130 at the 2010 census. It is at the northern edge of Erie County, south across the Erie Canal (Tonawanda Creek) from North Tonawanda, east of Grand Island, and north of Buffalo. It is part of the Buffalo-Niagara Falls metropolitan area.

History
The city's name is from the word Tahnawá•teh in Tuscarora meaning "confluent stream" 

Post-Revolutionary War white settlement at Tonawanda began with Henry Anguish, who built a log home in 1808. He added to the hamlet in 1811 with a tavern, both on the south side of Tonawanda Creek where it empties into the Niagara River. The hamlet grew slowly until the opening of the Erie Canal, completed in the course of the creek in 1825. The Town of Tonawanda was incorporated in 1836. The Erie Canal and the railroads that soon followed it provided economic opportunity. By the end of the 19th century, both sides of the canal were devoted to businesses as part of a leading lumber processing center. In the mid-19th century, the business center of Tonawanda was incorporated as a village within the town. The village united in a corporation with North Tonawanda across the canal. This corporation fell apart, and in 1904 the village was incorporated as the City of Tonawanda.

On September 26, 1898, a tornado struck the City of Tonawanda. After crossing over the river from Grand Island, the tornado damaged the old Murray School as well as several homes along Franklin and Kohler streets. Its worst havoc was wreaked along Fuller Avenue, where a dozen homes were severely damaged, several being leveled to the ground. No one was killed by the fierce storm, but there were numerous injuries.

Goose Island
From the mid-19th century to the early 20th century, a section of Tonawanda was known as Goose Island. Goose Island was a man-made island in the Niagara River formed by the Erie Canal. Goose Island was a triangular piece of land bordered on one side by the Niagara River, on the second side by the Tonawanda Creek, and on the third by the Erie Canal. It was then famous with seamen the world over as the terminus of the Erie Canal and for the Goose Island girls. The Goose Island Section of Tonawanda had many cheap boarding houses, cheap hotels, bars, and houses of ill repute. Canalers often wintered over on Goose Island. Goose Island was known as a bad section of Tonawanda, with drunkenness, brawling, and bawdy displays being commonplace. The gentrification of Goose Island began with the decline of the lumbering port business in Tonawanda and the building of a boxboard mill there on the island. Then the canal was motorized, eliminating mules and many canal men. Next the section of the canal from Tonawanda to Buffalo was abandoned in 1918. That section of the canal was filled in and Goose Island was no longer an island. The establishments in the Goose Island section of Tonawanda came under community pressure in the 1920s and 1930s and were closed, with more of the land there being given over to the boxboard mill. In the 1970s the boxboard mill closed and was razed along with many remaining Goose Island structures. Goose Island street names Tonawanda, First, Clay and Chestnut disappeared. At the turn of the millennium waterfront dwellings were built along the Niagara River, completing the gentrification of this area.

Spaulding Fibre
Spaulding Fibre became a manufacturer of leatherboard (made from leather scraps and wood pulp), transformer board, vulcanized fibre, bakelite (under the trade name Spauldite) and Filawound (fiberglass) tube.  Operating in Tonawanda from 1911 to 1992, it became the major employer in the city.  The company was founded in 1873 with a leatherboard mill by Jonas Spaulding and his brother Waldo in Townsend Harbor, Massachusetts. They did business as The Spaulding Brothers Company. Jonas Spaulding had three sons: Leon C., Huntley N. and Rolland H.

With industry expanding, Jonas established leatherboard mills at Milton and North Rochester, New Hampshire, in part to allow his sons to join him in the business. The New Hampshire mills operated under the name J. Spaulding and Sons. After Jonas Spaulding's death in 1900, his sons (by then living in New Hampshire, where they had corporate headquarters at Rochester) continued to operate these mills successfully. They brought the Townsend Harbor mill under the J. Spaulding and Sons banner in 1902.

With continued success, the three Spaulding brothers added a vulcanized fibre operation in Tonawanda, New York in 1911.  They added a fourth leatherboard mill in Milton (second in this community) in 1913. The mayor of Tonawanda, Charles Zuckmaier, had solicited the Spaulding brothers’ business in Tonawanda.  A ground-breaking ceremony was held on July 17, 1911, for the new plant, a $600,000 investment by J. Spaulding and Sons. Operations began on April 1, 1912, with 40 employees. The daily capacity of the plant at the time was five tons of fibre sheeting and one ton of fibre tubing.

Around 1924, the sons changed the name of the company to the Spaulding Fibre Company. In the 1930s, they added a second product at the Tonawanda plant: Spauldite, a "me too" phenol formaldehyde resin material made to compete with Bakelite. The trademark now owned by Spaulding Composites can be applied to laminates made with other natural or synthetic resins as well.

After Huntley Spaulding, the last of the three brothers, died in November 1955, the Spaulding Fibre Company became part of a charitable trust previously set up by Huntley and his only sister, Marion S. Potter. The trust was created to disburse their remaining wealth within 15 years of the death of the last sibling. Marion S. Potter died on September 27, 1957.

The company in Tonawanda flourished under foremen, superintendents and workers from the local blue collar workforce. It also attracted new residents who came for the jobs. One was Richard Spencer, who left the oil fields of Bradford, Pennsylvania, to be a superintendent for two decades. He managed through several labor strikes and periods of economic unrest for the company.

In 1956, the Tonawanda plant completed an expansion that doubled the paper mill and the vulcanized fibre-making capacity of the plant. In addition, after the death of Huntley Spaulding, corporate offices relocated to Wheeler Street from Rochester, New Hampshire. In the 1960s, the Tonawanda plant added a third product line, Filawound (fiberglass) tubing.

The 50th anniversary of the Wheeler Street Plant in 1961 was marked by a special 22-page section in the Tonawanda News. The Wheeler Street Plant reportedly covered , employed 1,500 workers, and had an annual payroll of $9,000,000. The company paid $153,818 in city taxes that year and was Tonawanda's largest taxpayer. The plant was nearing its peak, but there was more expansion to come.

In 1966, the charitable trust sold the Spaulding Fibre Company to Monogram Industries.  The Tonawanda plant began a slow decline during a period of industrial restructuring and product and manufacturing changes. In 1984, Monogram Industries sold the Spaulding Fibre Company to Nortek. In 1988, Nortek changed the company name to Spaulding Composites. Spaulding Composites closed the Tonawanda plant on August 24, 1992.

By the time the plant closed, employment had declined to 300. Since the closure of the Tonawanda plant, Spaulding Composites twice filed for bankruptcy. It fell into disrepair and, because of the wastes of the industrial processes, was classified as a brown field site under environmental regulations.

In 2006, the Erie County Development Agency contracted for demolition of the derelict facilities.  It was punctuated by the felling of the -tall smoke stack that dominated the site. (This event is documented with a handful of videos on YouTube.)  Cleanup of the site was declared complete in August 2010.

Historic sites
The following are historic sites in Tonawanda of such significance as to be listed on the National Register of Historic Places:

Geography
Tonawanda is at  (43.01119, -78.877399).

Adjacent cities and towns 
Niagara County, City of North Tonawanda - north
Town of Tonawanda - west/south/east
Town of Grand Island across the Niagara River - northwest

Neighborhoods and locations
 Gastown – A neighborhood in the northeast corner of Tonawanda, bordering the Erie Canal. Its name comes from the Gas Light Co., which was built on Long's Point, home of the historical Long's Homestead.
 "The Hill" (aka "Riverview") – A region centered around Tonawanda High School, so named because of its slightly elevated topography when compared with the rest of the relatively flat city. It is also known as Clay Hill as it was formed by a terminal glacial moraine that deposited the clay that forms the hill. The area near the high school was the site of popular clay tennis courts.
 Millstream – A neighborhood on the city's eastern side. It is named for a stream that flowed through the area, but has since been mostly channelled underground.
 Ives – a local skatepark, ice hockey rink, soccer field, and tennis court in the middle of Tonawanda. Starting out as a small blue kiddy pool, it was remodelled to become a skatepark and other things.
 Delawanda – an older residential neighborhood north of Canton St. and east of Delaware St.
The City of Tonawanda is called by many of its residents the "C.O.T.", meaning the "City" rather than "Town" of Tonawanda.

Major highways
  New York State Route 265 (Main St., Seymour St., River Rd.) North-South Roadway from the Tonawanda town line (south) north through the city and over the Erie Canal/Tonawanda Creek into North Tonawanda.
  New York State Route 266 (Niagara St.), East-West Roadway from in the city that parallels the Niagara River from the Tonawanda town line (west) through the city to its east end at Seymour St./River Rd. (NY 265) intersection in the city.
  New York State Route 384 (Delaware St.), North-South Road from the Tonawanda town line at the south, north through the city and to North Tonawanda by the way of Main St. across the Canal.
  New York State Route 425 (Twin Cities Memorial Highway.) North-South Highway through the east part of town from its south end at Interstate 290 north to North Tonawanda once it crosses over the Canal. (This is a major transportation route for traffic to-and-from North Tonawanda and beyond).

Culture

Canal Fest
In conjunction with the City of North Tonawanda, the City of Tonawanda celebrates an annual Canal Fest of the Tonawandas. For one week, members of both communities celebrate Tonawanda's historic location on the western end of the Erie Canal in the largest festival of its kind. The Festival began in 1983 when Freemasons in the area, in conjunction with several state and regional leaders, set out to promote the businesses of the Tonawandas, provide fund raising opportunities for local non-profit organizations, and provide recreational activities for the citizens of both Tonawanda and North Tonawanda.

The first Canal Fest was held on both sides of the canal in 1983. Today, the Canal fest is organized by the Canal Fest of the Tonawandas Inc., a non-profit organization. It is estimated over 150,000 people attend the Canal Fest each year, though an accurate number is impossible to obtain since attending the event is free of charge and there are no turnstiles to measure crowds. The Canal Fest is the largest event held along the Erie Canal today and is in the top percentile of New York State events. In 2020, Canal Fest was cancelled for the first time due to the 2019-2020 Coronavirus Pandemic.

Gateway Harbor

Also in conjunction with the city of North Tonawanda, Tonawanda is home to Gateway Harbor, a public park that runs along the Erie Canal just before it joins the Niagara River. During the summer, local boaters are free to dock at the park, and the area becomes popular during the free concerts set up by the local chamber of commerce. Various local businesses sponsor a series of concerts on both the Tonawanda and North Tonawanda sides of the park.

Landmarks
The Historical Society of the Tonawandas operates a museum in the former New York Central & Hudson Valley Railroad station, which has exhibits depicting the area's lumber industry and Erie Canal history. The Long Homestead is a restored Pennsylvania German-style house built in 1829 and containing period furniture from the early 19th century (the Historical Society of the Tonawandas provides guided tours). Isle View Park, on the Niagara River overlooking Grand Island, is available for biking, hiking, rollerblading, fishing and launching boats. The Riverwalk trail passes through the park, and a pedestrian foot bridge connects the park to Niawanda Park.

NFL team
Tonawanda was home of the Tonawanda Kardex Lumbermen, a professional football team active between 1916 and 1921, best known for its brief one-game stint in the National Football League.

Demographics

At the 2000 census, there were 16,136 people, 6,741 households, and 4,361 families residing in the city. The population density was 4,252.9 people per square mile (1,643.8/km2). There were 7,119 housing units at an average density of 1,876.3 per square mile (725.2/km2). The racial makeup of the city was 98.08% White, 0.42% Black or African American, 0.46% Native American, 0.39% Asian, 0.01% Pacific Islander, 0.17% from other races, and 0.46% from two or more races. Hispanic or Latino of any race were 0.89% of the population.

There were 6,741 households, of which 28.9% had children under the age of 18 living with them, 49.9% were married couples living together, 10.8% had a female householder with no husband present, and 35.3% were non-families. 31.2% of all households were made up of individuals, and 13.1% had someone living alone who was 65 years of age or older. The average household size was 2.39 and the average family size was 3.01.

23.9% of the population were under the age of 18, 7.6% from 18 to 24, 29.0% from 25 to 44, 22.7% from 45 to 64, and 16.8% who were 65 years of age or older. The median age was 39 years. For every 100 females, there were 94.4 males. For every 100 females age 18 and over, there were 90.2 males.

The median household income was $45,721.

In popular culture
Tonawanda is the home of inventor Phillip Louis (Phil) Perew, who is fictionalized in the alternate history world created by artist and author couple Paul Guinan and Anina Bennett. In this history, created for the graphic novels Boilerplate and Femopolis, Perew creates an electromechanical man, called the 'Automatic Man', in the late 19th century. (At the time of writing, in February 2007, Femopolis has not been published.)

In the HBO miniseries Band of Brothers, Easy Company soldier Warren Muck states he is from Tonawanda and he swam across the Niagara River. "Skip" Muck died in the Battle of Bastogne and is on the City of Tonawanda memorial to soldiers killed in World War II.

In the 1998 film Saving Private Ryan, Private James Ryan is rescued by Tom Hanks' character.  The Ryan character was based upon Sgt. Fritz (Frederick) Niland. Niland lost two brothers, Robert and Preston in the Normandy Landings. Edward Niland (a third brother) was listed as killed in action in the Pacific, but was found in a Japanese POW camp at the end of the war. Fritz and Skip Muck were best friends and enlisted in the 101st together in 1942.

In Mark Twain's The Diary of Adam and Eve, written in 1904, and popularized by the musical The Apple Tree, Tonawanda is identified as the site Adam and Eve move to after they are removed from the Garden of Eden (which is identified as "Niagara Falls Park").

Notable people

Ockie Anderson, former NFL player
Fred Brumm, NFL player
John T. Bush, former New York State Senator
Rick Cassata, retired CFL quarterback who attended Tonawanda High School
Glen Cook, retired Texas Rangers pitcher, attended Tonawanda High School, Graduate of Ithaca College
Jane Corwin, New York State Assemblywoman
Dave Geisel, retired MLB player who attended Tonawanda High School
Gregory John Hartmayer, Bishop of Savannah
Frank Hinkey, member of College Football Hall of Fame
Chris Lee, former U.S. Congressman 
Bert Lewis, former MLB pitcher
Richard Matt, convicted felon, prison escapee
Sam Melville, bombing conspirator
Joe Mesi, retired boxer
Blake Miller, former football head coach of Central Michigan Chippewas
 Warren H. Muck, Member of famed Easy Company 506th, 101st. 
John Neumann, first American bishop to be canonized
Niland brothers, notable World War II soldiers
Marc Panepinto, New York State Senator
Phillip Louis (Phil) Perew, Lake boat captain, inventor, sporting promoter, landlord of notorious establishments on Goose Island in Tonawanda
Thomas Perry, author
Bobby Shuttleworth, MLS goalkeeper
John Simson Woolson, former Federal judge
Jules Yakapovich, longtime Kenmore West High School football coach

See also
 Tonawanda (disambiguation)

References

External links
 City of Tonawanda official website

Cities in New York (state)
Buffalo–Niagara Falls metropolitan area
Cities in Erie County, New York